Apollo 3 is a German band consisting of three members – Henry Horn (born 1997), Marvin Schlatter (born 1996) and Dario Flick (born 1997).

History

2006–2009: Early years and debut album 
The members all come from Cologne and already played together at the age of nine. They were in the same form in school for three years. When they turned ten, their class teacher noticed their musical talent and made contact to the songwriter and music producer Niko Floss. Their debut album Apollo 3 was published on 8 May 2009 through the major label Sony Music Entertainment and included the single "Superhelden", which was used as theme melody in the film .

At the time of the publication, the band members were 11 (Henry) and 12 (Marvin and Dario) years old. For the song "Superhelden", a music video was made, which was played in cinemas.
The single reached number 35 in the German charts; the album reached number 33.
On 19 June 2009, the second single release, "Startschuss", was published, which reached number 84 in the German charts.

2010: Second album 2010 and contributing in a cinema film 
On 12 March 2010, the second album, 2010, was released, which included next to ten old songs from the previous album five new ones. Two of those were published as singles. The single "Chaos" was released on 9 April 2010 and "Unverwundbar" on 13 August 2010. In the film Teufelskicker based on Frauke Nahrgangs books and audiobooks, the band members all played a role. Henry played the main character Moritz, while Marvin and Dario played the minor roles Shadow and Alex. The theme melody was "Diabolisch" from their album.

2011: Theme melody for a cinema film 
As a theme melody for the film Löwenzahn – Das Kinoabenteuer the song "Überflieger" was released, which was also published as a single on 6 May 2011. The single "Adrenalin" from the first album was also used.

2012–2013: Third album Feier dein Leben 
In 2012 the songs "Limit" and "Wir sehn uns dann am Meer" were performed in concerts as forerunners for the next album. Latter was published in the summer of 2013 as a single, in a version without Marvin singing. On 13 September another forerunner was published as a single "Feier Dein Leben", again without Marvin singing. In the same month, on 27 September 2013, the album "Feier Dein Leben" was published.
The album not only has differences in the style of music to the previous albums, but also in the voice of Henry. Also Marvin only sings in one of 13 songs. In September 2013 RTL2  made the second single extraction from their 2013 album "Feier Dein Leben" to their campaign song.

2014: Performances and tour 
The band had a guest performance in the scripted reality show . In the episode they played a concert in a club with a performance of "Feier Dein Leben". In February 2014 the band went on their "Feier Dein Leben" – tour in Berlin, Hamburg and Cologne.

2015: Working on a new album 
The members of the Apollo 3 announced a new album with photos in the studio. On 20 March 2015, they revealed a snippet from one of their new songs.

Other works 
As their first song "Superhelden" was the theme song of the film , the band shot a music video with Leonie Tepe (Maria), who also played one of the crocodiles.

2007: Henry Horn had a part in one episode of Alarm für Cobra 11 – Die Autobahnpolizei.

In the teenager series Schloss Einstein, the band had a guest part playing a jury.

They were the prominent faces in the RTL2 "It's fun" campaign for eight weeks.

Members 
 Henry Horn – lead vocals
 Dario Alessandro Barbanti-Flick – guitar
 Marvin Schlatter – keyboard, rapping

Filmography

Singles 
 2009: "Superhelden" ("Superheroes")
 2009: "Startschuss" ("Starting Signal")
 2010: "Chaos"
 2013: "Wir sehn uns dann am Meer" ("See You at the Sea")
 2013: "Feier dein Leben" ("Celebrate Your Life")

Music videos 
 2009: "Superhelden" ("Superheroes")
 2009: "Startschuss" ("Starting Signal")
 2010: "Chaos"
 2013: "Wir sehn uns dann am Meer" ("See You at the Sea")
 2013: "Feier dein Leben" ("Celebrate Your Life")
 2014: "Limit"

Soundtrack 
 2009:  – Superhelden ("Superheroes") and Adrenalin
 2009: E-Explosiv – Das Magazin – Brich mein Herz ("Break My Heart")
 2010: Die Teufelskicker – Diabolisch ("Diabolically") and Adrenalin Remix
 2010:  – Superhelden ("Superheroes")
 2011:  – Superhelden ("Superheroes")
 2011: Löwenzahn – Das Kinoabenteuer – Überflieger ("High Flyer")

Album 
2009: Apollo 3
2010: 2010
2013: Feier dein Leben ("Celebrate Your Life")

External links 
 
 
 
 Official fan site
 

German rock music groups
German pop rock music groups
Musical groups established in 2006